Parallelomma is a genus of dung flies in the family Scathophagidae. There are about five described species in Parallelomma, found mainly in North America and Europe.

Species
These species belong to the genus Parallelomma:
 Parallelomma flava (Szilady, 1943)
 Parallelomma media Becker, 1894
 Parallelomma merzi Ozerov, 2008
 Parallelomma paradis Hering, 1923
 Parallelomma vittatum (Meigen, 1826)

References

Further reading

 

Scathophagidae
Articles created by Qbugbot
Muscoidea genera